Explorer 1 was the first American satellite to reach orbit on 31 January 1958.

Launches

January

|}

February

|}

March

|}

April

|}

May

|}

June

|}

July

|}

August

|}

September

|}

October

|}

November

|}

December

|}

Orbital launch summary

By country

By rocket

By family

By type and configuration

By launch site

By orbit

See also
Timeline of spaceflight

References

Footnotes

1958 in spaceflight
Spaceflight by year